The Skyhigh Skybaby is an American ultralight aircraft that was designed and produced by Skyhigh Ultralights Inc, introduced in 1983. The aircraft was supplied in the form of plans for amateur construction.

Design and development
It features a cable-braced high-wing, a single-seat, open cockpit, conventional landing gear and a single engine in pusher configuration.

The aircraft is made from wood. The fuselage is built around a wooden torsion box that is foam-filled for stiffness. The tailboom is a  diameter 6061-T6 aluminum tube. Its  span wing is constructed from Douglas fir spars and wing ribs, covered with doped aircraft fabric. The wing features half-span ailerons and cable-bracing from a single kingpost. The pilot is accommodated in the open cockpit on a fixed seat. There is no windshield. The landing gear is bungee suspended and the tail wheel is steerable.

Specifications (Skybaby)

References

1980s United States ultralight aircraft
Homebuilt aircraft
Single-engined pusher aircraft